{{Infobox album
| name         = Live in Europe
| type         = live
| artist       = Flying Colors
| cover        = 
| released     = 15 October 2013
| recorded     = 20 September 2012
| venue        = 013 (Tilburg NL)
| studio       = 
| genre        = Progressive Rock
| length       = 100:15
| label        = Mascot Label Group
| producer     = 
| prev_title   = Flying Colors
| prev_year    = 2012
| year         = 2013
| next_title   = Second Nature (2014)
}}Live in Europe is the second release from prog/rock supergroup, Flying Colors. It was recorded on 20 September 2012, during the band's first tour, at the 013 in Tilburg, Netherlands. It was the 12th show the band had ever played. Mascot Label Group released the album on Blu-ray, DVD, 3-LP vinyl, 2-CD, Mastered for iTunes, and MP3 digital download. The Blu-ray and DVD versions included stereo and 5.1 surround mixes, and a 45-minute documentary, First Flight, edited by Randy George. Live in Europe'' debuted at No. 1 on the French national charts.

Three live videos were released by Mascot Label Group: "Odyssey", "The Storm", and "All Falls Down". The third vinyl disk contained a hidden track, "Space Trucking", which was recorded during an impromptu encore which closed the show; the band has never before or since performed the song.

The band performed the entire first album, and five cover songs from individual band members: "Can't Find a Way" (Endochine), "Odyssey" (Dixie Dregs), "June" (Spock's Beard), "Repentance" (Dream Theater), and "Space Trucking" (Deep Purple). Additionally, Casey began singing Leonard Cohen's "Hallelujah" about halfway through the tour, after Mike Portnoy heard him singing it during soundcheck. As a prelude to "Repentance", Dave LaRue plays a short bass solo, "Spur of the Moment", which is the only Flying Colors piece credited to one songwriter.

Track listing 

 "Blue Ocean"
 "Shoulda Coulda Woulda"
 "Love is What I'm Waiting For"
 "Can't Find a Way"
 "The Storm"
 "Odyssey"
 "Forever in a Daze"
 "Hallelujah"
 "Better Than Walking Away"
 "Kayla"
 "Fool in My Heart"
 "Spur of the Moment"
 "Repentance"
 "June"
 "All Falls Down"
 "Everything Changes"
 "Infinite Fire"

Credits

Executive Producer & Audio Post Production by Bill Evans
Directed and Edited by Bernhard Baran / b-light-pictures
Mixed by Jerry Guidroz
Lighting Design by Yenz Nyholm
 Camera Crew: Rüdiger Jonitz, Bernhard Baran, Yannick Becker, Manuel Theobald, Dirk Meissner, Jochen Fink, Philipp Neuer, Karl Henssler
 Recording Engineer: Felix Walch
 Tour Manager: Lothar Strunk
 Assistant Tour Manager & Merchandise: Chris Thompson
 Front of House: Jerry Guidroz
 Guitar and bass technician: Tommy Alderson
 Drum technician: Jose Baraquio
 Keyboard technician: Bill Evans
 Layout & Design: Roy Koch
 Cover Artists & Photo Editing: Bill Evans, Roy Koch, Dick Truxaw, Stephen van Baalen
 Blu-ray & DVD authoring: Digital Pictures Media Masters bv.
 Title graphics and animation: Marc Papeghin
 Quality control: Kerstin Susewind
 Orchestral arrangement of "Everything Changes": Michal Mierzejewski
 Band management: Bill Evans

References

2013 live albums
Flying Colors (band) albums
Live albums by American artists
Live progressive rock albums